Taliqua Clancy (born 25 June 1992) is an Australian volleyball and beach volleyball player who represented Australia at the 2016 Summer Olympics in beach volleyball, partnered with Louise Bawden. She is the first Indigenous Australian volleyball player to represent Australia at the Olympics. Clancy plays as a left-side blocker.

Early life
Clancy was born in Kingaroy, Queensland, into a family of Indigenous Australian descent (Wulli Wulli and Goreng Goreng). She spent the first 15 years of her life in Kingaroy. She turned down a netball scholarship offer from the Australian Institute of Sport and instead accepted a scholarship to the Queensland Academy of Sport for beach volleyball. When Clancy was 17 she accepted an Australian Institute of Sport scholarship and relocated to Adelaide to participate in the national beach volleyball program. In 2019, she returned to her home state of Queensland and is now based in Brisbane.

Professional career

Rio de Janeiro – 2016 Olympics
She participated in the 2016 Summer Olympics in Rio with partner Louise Bawden, reaching the quarter-finals.

Gold Coast – 2018 Commonwealth Games
Taliqua participated in the 2018 Commonwealth Games on the Gold Coast with partner Mariafe Artacho del Solar. The Australian pairing won their 3 preliminary pool matches without losing a set, with wins over Cyprus's Manolina Konstantinou and Mariota Angelopoulou (21–14, 21–9), Grenada's Renisha Stafford and Thornia Williams (21–2, 21–11), and Scotland's Lynne Beattie and Melissa Coutts (21–9, 21–9). Finishing top of their pool they advanced to the quarter-finals, where they easily dispatched Rwanda's Charlotte Nzayisenga and Denyse Mutatsimpundu (21–9, 21–8) to advance to the semi-finals. After winning the opening set of their semi-final against Vanuatu's pairing of Linline Matauatu and Miller Pata, the Aussie duo lost their first set of the tournament to send the match to the decider, which they won convincingly to advance to the gold medal match (21–19, 16–21, 15–9). In the match of the tournament, the Australian team came up agonisingly short against their more experienced and higher ranked Canadian opponents, Melissa Humana-Paredes and Sarah Pavan (19–21, 20–22). Although their winning run came to an end, they secured a silver medal at their first Commonwealth Games together.

Hamburg – 2019 World Championships
Taliqua participated in the 2019 World Championships in Hamburg with partner Mariafe Artacho del Solar. The Australian pairing comfortably won their first preliminary match against Mauritius' Maita Cousin and Letendrie Nathalie (21–5, 21–6) before being defeated by the Dutch pair of Joy Stubbe and Marleen van Iersel (19–21, 22–24). In a must win match, the Australians prevailed by the slimmest of margins over the American duo of Brooke Sweat and Kerri Walsh Jennings (21-19, 24–22) to advance to the elimination rounds. It was during their first elimination match that Mariafe suffered an injury to her Medial Collateral Ligament in her left knee, despite this injury, they defeated Canada's Heather Bansley and Brandie Wilkerson (21–15, 21–19). Due to the injury, the Aussie pairing were unsure if they could continue with their round of 16 match against Switzerland's Joana Heidrich and Anouk Vergé-Dépré the following day. Nevertheless, in true Australian spirit, the duo played on and won a tight 3 set match against the Swiss (21–16, 21–23, 15–9).

Advancing to their first World Championships quarterfinal they were one win away from a top four finish, a remarkable achievement given Mariafe's injury. With no other teams being fully aware of the injury, the pair continued on and endured a battle royale in the first set of their quarterfinal against their Russian opponents Nadezda Makroguzova and Svetlana Kholomina eventually winning that set and comfortably closing out the match in the second (24–22, 21–14). Unfortunately, they were not able to back up their quarterfinal victory later that same day and were defeated in their semifinal by the American pairing of Alix Klineman and April Ross (15–21, 18–21). Despite not being at their best, the Australians continued to show true resilience; after the semi final loss and pushing past the pain. They went on to win their bronze medal play-off against the Swiss team of Nina Betschart and Tanja Hüberli (21–18, 22–20) to claim one of their best results and most memorable achievements.

Tokyo – 2020 Olympics 
On 4 August 2021, Clancy and partner Mariafe Artacho del Solar upset the world number-one team of Canada in the quarter finals. On 5 August, they defeated the Latvian team with a straight-sets win to advance to the gold-medal match against the United States, which they subsequently lost to earn the silver medal.

References

External links
 
 
 
 
 

1992 births
Living people
Indigenous Australian sportspeople
Australian women's volleyball players
Australian women's beach volleyball players
Beach volleyball players at the 2016 Summer Olympics
Olympic beach volleyball players of Australia
Beach volleyball players at the 2018 Commonwealth Games
Beach volleyball blockers
People from Kingaroy
Commonwealth Games silver medallists for Australia
Beach volleyball players at the 2020 Summer Olympics
Olympic silver medalists for Australia
Medalists at the 2020 Summer Olympics
Olympic medalists in beach volleyball
Beach volleyball players at the 2022 Commonwealth Games
Sportswomen from Queensland
Australian Institute of Sport alumni
Medallists at the 2022 Commonwealth Games